The women's road race at the 2016 World University Cycling Championship took place in Tagaytay, Philippines on 18 March 2016. The race was 80 km long. 26 riders from 13 countries registered for the race. Half of the riders did not finish.

Final classification

Source; DNF: Did not finish

References

External links
International University Sports Federation - Cycling 

World University Cycling Championships
World University Cycling Championship
Cycling